Shapovalov is a Russian masculine surname. Its feminine counterpart is Shapovalova. Notable people with the surname include:

Denis Shapovalov (born 1999), Canadian tennis player
Igor Shapovalov (born 1985), Russian football player
Ivan Shapovalov (born 1966), Russian musical producer 
Roman Shapovalov (born 1981), Russian football player
Ruslan Shapovalov (born 1995), Russian football player 
Sergei Shapovalov (born 1995), Russian football player
Viktor Shapovalov (born 1965), Russian auto racing driver
Yevgeny Shapovalov (1904–1977), Soviet army general 
Yevgeniya Shapovalova (born 1986), Russian cross country skier

See also

 
 
 Shapoval

Russian-language surnames